Pharrell Williams is an American singer, songwriter, and film and record producer. Since his debut as a music producer with The Neptunes, he has worked with many artists in the contemporary music industry, such as Beyoncé, Madonna, Jay-Z, Kanye West, Calvin Harris, Gwen Stefani, Ariana Grande, Alicia Keys, Rihanna, Justin Timberlake, Janelle Monáe, Mariah Carey, Solange Knowles, Snoop Dogg and Britney Spears. Williams has also collaborated in some of the best-selling singles worldwide, such as "Get Lucky", "I Just Wanna Love U (Give It 2 Me)" and "Blurred Lines". He started his solo career with two albums In My Mind (2006) and G.I.R.L. (2014). The latter album produced the lead single "Happy", which has sold almost 14 million copies worldwide.

Williams has received numerous accolades and nominations; he has won 13 Grammy Awards from 38 nominations, including three as Producer of the Year, Non-Classical (one came as a part of The Neptunes in 2004). He has also won four BET Awards, six Billboard Music Award, one MTV Video Music Award, one Brit Award and four NAACP Image Awards. In 2012 Williams was honored with the ASCAP Golden Note Award for his "extraordinary career milestones records achieved as a songwriter, composer and artist".

In 2014, Williams was nominated for an Academy Award for Best Original Song at the 86th Academy Awards for his song "Happy", part of Despicable Me 2s soundtrack. In 2017, he received a nomination for Best Picture for co-producing the film Hidden Figures. The film also gave Williams a nomination at the Golden Globe Awards for Best Original Score. Williams has received three nominations at the Satellite Awards and four at the Black Reel Awards.

Academy Awards

American Music Awards

Annie Award

Antville Music Video Awards

The Antville Music Video Awards are online awards for the best music video and music video directors of the year. They were first awarded in 2005.

ARIA Music Awards

ASCAP Music Awards

ASCAP Film & Tv Music Awards

BBC Music Awards

BET Hip Hop Awards

BET Awards

Billboard Music Awards

Billboard R&B/Hip-Hop Awards

Black Reel Awards

Brit Awards

Daytime Emmy Awards

Denver Film Critics Society

GAFFA Awards

GAFFA Awards (Denmark)
Delivered since 1991, the GAFFA Awards are a Danish award that rewards popular music by the magazine of the same name.

!
|-
| 2013
| "Get Lucky" (with Daft Punk)
| rowspan="2"| Best Foreign Song
| 
| style="text-align:center;" |
|-
| 2014
| "Happy"
| 
| style="text-align:center;" |
|-
|}

Gold Derby Awards

Golden Globe Awards

Grammy Awards

!Ref.
|-
|rowspan=2|2003
|"Pass the Courvoisier, Part II"
|Best Rap Performance by a Duo or Group
|
|rowspan=41|
|-
|Nellyville
|rowspan=2|Album of the Year
|
|-
|rowspan=7|2004
|rowspan=2|Justified
|
|-
|Best Pop Vocal Album
|
|-
|The Neptunes
|Producer of the Year, Non-Classical
|
|-
|"Frontin'"
|rowspan=2|Best Rap/Sung Collaboration
|
|-
|rowspan=2|"Beautiful"
|
|-
|rowspan=3|Best Rap Song
|
|-
|"Excuse Me Miss"
|
|-
|rowspan=3|2005
|rowspan=2|"Drop It Like It's Hot"
|
|-
|Best Rap Performance by a Duo or Group
|
|-
|"She Wants to Move"
|Best Urban/Alternative Performance
|
|-
|rowspan=4|2006
|"Hollaback Girl"
|Record of the Year
|
|-
|The Emancipation of Mimi
|rowspan=2|Album of the Year
|
|-
|Love. Angel. Music. Baby.
|
|-
|The Neptunes
|Producer of the Year, Non-Classical
|
|-
|rowspan=2|2007
|"Money Maker"
|Best Rap Song
|
|-
|In My Mind
|Best Rap Album
|
|-
|2009
|"Give It 2 Me"
|Best Dance Recording
|
|-
|2013
|Channel Orange
|rowspan=3|Album of the Year
|
|-
|rowspan=7|2014
|Random Access Memories
|
|-
|good kid, m.A.A.d city
|
|-
|rowspan=2|"Get Lucky"
|Record of the Year
|
|-
|rowspan=2|Best Pop Duo/Group Performance
|
|-
|rowspan=2|"Blurred Lines"
|
|-
|Record of the Year
|
|-
|Self
|Producer of the Year, Non-Classical
|
|-
|rowspan=6|2015
|"Happy" 
|Best Pop Solo Performance
|
|-
|"Happy"
|Best Music Video
|
|-
|rowspan=2|Girl
|Best Urban Contemporary Album
|
|-
|rowspan=4|Album of the Year
|
|-
|Beyoncé
|
|-
|x
|
|-
|rowspan=4|2016
|To Pimp a Butterfly
|
|-
|rowspan=2|"Alright"
|Song of the Year
|
|-
|Best Rap Song
|
|-
|"Freedom"
|Best Music Video
|
|-
|rowspan=2|2018
|Hidden Figures: The Album
|Best Compilation Soundtrack for Visual Media
|
|-
|Hidden Figures
|Best Score Soundtrack for Visual Media
|
|-
|rowspan=2|2019
|Sweetener
|Best Pop Vocal Album
|
|-
|Self
|Producer of the Year, Non-Classical
|
|-

Hollywood Film Awards

|-
|2019
|"Letter to My Godfather"  
|Hollywood Song Award
|
|-
|}

Hollywood Music in Media Awards

|-
|2016
|"Running" 
|Best Song – Feature Film
|
|-
|2017
|"There's Something Special" 
|Best Original Song - Animated Film
|
|-
|2019
|"Letter To My Godfather" 
|Best Original Song - Documentary 
|
|}

Hollywood walk of fame

|-
|2014
|Pharrell Williams
|Hollywood Walk of Fame
|
|}

Houston Film Critics Society

|-
|2016
|"Running"
|Best Original Song
|
|}

iHeartRadio Music Awards

International Dance Music Awards

Kid's Choice Awards

Latin American Music Awards

Latin Grammy Awards

Los Premios 40 Principales

Los Premios 40 Principales América

MOBO Awards

MTV Africa Music Awards

MTV Australian Music Awards

MTV Europe Music Awards

MTV Millennial Awards

MTV Video Music Awards

MTV Video Music Awards Japan

Much Music Video Awards

NAACP Image Awards

Neox Fan Awards

People's Choice Awards

Premio Lo Nuestro

Producers Guild of America Awards

Radio Disney Music Awards

Satellite Awards

Soul Train Music Awards

Teen Choice Awards

References 

Williams, Pharrell
Awards